Hakeem Manzoor (17 January 1937 – 2006) was an Urdu writer, poet and administrator.

Life
He was born in Srinagar in the Indian state of Jammu and Kashmir. His books in Urdu include Na Tamaam, Barf Ruton Ki Aag and Lahu Lamas Chinar. Manzoor served in the state administration in various capacities. He headed the Education Department and worked as the District Development Commissioner Baramulla and the Custodian General besides the Jammu and Kashmir Resident Commissioner in New Delhi. He also received an award from the Cultural Academy of Jammu and kashmir. His original name was Manzoor ahmad. He attended a local High School and graduated from S.P. college srinagar

References

People from Srinagar
Indian male poets
Indian Education Service officers
1937 births
2006 deaths
20th-century Indian poets
Poets from Jammu and Kashmir
20th-century Indian male writers